The Ostrach is a  long right tributary stream of the Danube in Baden-Württemberg, Germany.

Geography 

The Ostrach originates on the north side of the European watershed, in the vicinity of Fleischwangen in the Landkreis Ravensburg and drains out of the Pfrunger wetlands. It runs parallel to the Ablach for most of its length, flowing between two moraine hills by Ostrach, through the Weithart, and the Göge-Ablach plateau.

Localities on the Ostrach 
Die Ostrach traverses or touches several districts and communities from its source to the Danube:  The locale of  Fleischwangen, where it originates, Guggenhausen, Riedhausen, Ostrach and its subdivisions of Laubbach, Jettkofen, Wangen, Einhart and Habsthal, the Mengen city subdivision of Rosna, the Hohentengen subdivisions of Bremen and Beizkofen, and finally by Hundersingen, where it reaches the Danube.

Tributaries 
Tributaries of the Ostrach include the Wilhelmsdorf  canal, die Fleischwanger Ach (creek), the Hornbach, the Tiefenbach and the Seebach.

Ecology 

Since 2005, a beaver population has developed in the Pfrunger-Burgweiler wetlands – since October 2008 verifiable. In the upper range of the Ostrach, the beavers have erected a dam across the stream, creating a pond that holds 1000 cubic meters of water, causing the tributaries of the Ostrach to overflow their banks, to the great frustration of the farmers in Riedhausen and Laubbach.

A seven million Euro protection project was planned with the goal to protect the wetlands and the watershed. The project has been finished in 2015.

References

See also
List of rivers of Baden-Württemberg

Rivers of Baden-Württemberg
Bodenseekreis
Swabia
Rivers of Germany